Counting and Cracking is a play by Australian playwright S. Shakthidharan, first staged in 2019.

Synopsis
The play concerns four generations of the one Tamil family across Sri Lanka and Australia.

Productions
The play was first produced by Belvoir and Co-Curious at the Sydney Town Hall for the 2019 Sydney Festival, with Eamon Flack as director. The production was also mounted at the Adelaide Festival that same year.

Awards
Shakthidharan's script was originally titled A Counting and Cracking of Heads, and was the joint winner of the 2015 NSW Philip Parsons Fellowship for Emerging Playwrights.

Counting and Cracking received seven 2019 Helpmann Awards including Best Play and Best New Australian Work and won best mainstage production at the 2019 Sydney Theatre Awards.

It won both the Victorian Prize for Literature and the Victorian Premier's Prize for Drama at the 2020 Victorian Premier's Literary Awards, with theatre director Eamon Flack credited as associate writer.

In April 2020 Counting and Cracking won the Nick Enright Prize for Playwriting at the New South Wales Premier's Literary Awards.

References

Australian plays
2019 plays